This is a list of World Hockey Association (WHA) players who played at least one game from the 1972–73 WHA season to the 1978–79 WHA season.

By player name

A

B

C

D

E

F

G

H

I

J

K

L

M

N

O

P

R

S

T

U

V

W

Y

Z

By team 
List of Birmingham Bulls (WHA) players
List of Calgary Cowboys (WHA) players
List of Chicago Cougars players
List of Cincinnati Stingers players
List of Cleveland Crusaders players
List of Denver Spurs/Ottawa Civics players
List of Edmonton Oilers (WHA) players
List of Houston Aeros players
List of Indianapolis Racers players
List of Los Angeles Sharks players
List of Michigan Stags/Baltimore Blades players
List of Minnesota Fighting Saints players
List of New England Whalers players
List of New York Golden Blades/New Jersey Knights players
List of New York Raiders players
List of Ottawa Nationals players
List of Philadelphia Blazers players
List of Phoenix Roadrunners (WHA) players
List of Quebec Nordiques (WHA) players
List of San Diego Mariners (WHA) players
List of Toronto Toros players
List of Vancouver Blazers players 
List of Winnipeg Jets (WHA) players

By specific group 
WHA Hall of Fame
WHA Playoff MVP
WHA Amateur Draft
WHA General Player Draft
WHA Playoff MVP
WHA Amateur Draft

See also 
List of WHA head coaches
List of NHL players

References